Bosc-le-Hard is a commune in the Seine-Maritime department in the Normandy region in northern France.

Geography
The A29 autoroute forms the northern border of the commune.

Heraldry

Population

Places of interest
 The church of St.John, dating from the eighteenth century.
 The modern church of St. Eloi.
 The chateau du Réel.
 The chapel at Augeville.

Twin towns
  Goldenstedt, Germany, since 1989

See also
Communes of the Seine-Maritime department

References

External links

 Official commune website 

Communes of Seine-Maritime